Waldburg-Trauchburg was a County within Holy Roman Empire, ruled by the House of Waldburg, located in southeastern Baden-Württemberg, Germany. Waldburg-Trauchburg was a partition of Waldburg and was partitioned several times, before being annexed by the County of Waldburg-Zeil (another partition of Waldburg) in 1772.

States and territories established in 1424
1722 disestablishments